Ansumana Samateh  (born November 26, 1987) is a Gambian footballer who plays for Wallidan F.C.

Career
Samateh began his career on youth side from Wallidan F.C. and was promoted to first team in January 2002.

International career
He is in the extended squad from the Gambia national football team.

1987 births
Living people
Gambian footballers
The Gambia international footballers
Association football goalkeepers
Wallidan FC players